Ali Said Alamin Mandhry, also known as Chef Ali L’artiste, is a TV celebrity chef in Kenya.

Early life and education
According to Mandhry, inspiration from his grandfather got him into the kitchen at age nine, and started selling cakes he baked to fellow students and teachers at age twelve.

After high school, Mandhry worked as an intern at the Sarova White Sands Beach Resort and Spa. He later enrolled in a food production apprenticeship course at Kenya Utalii College. Mandhry graduated with an honours degree from Kenya Utalii College.

Career
In January 2011, Mandhry became a culinary instructor at Kenya Utalii College's Mombasa campus, in charge of the food production department.

Mandhry currently hosts a cooking show dubbed Food Time that broadcasts on Pwani TV and Celebrity Kitchen Raid on Zuku Entertainment Channel 100 that broadcasts Internationally. previously he hosted a cooking show on NTV Kenya, Tamu Tamu: Kenyan Cuisine with a Twist and also Pilipili Jikoni, a Swahili radio program on Pilipili Fm in Mombasa. 

Mandhry also co hosts Power Breakfast every Thursday on Citizen TV Kenya.

Mandhry is an author and writes the ‘Eats’ recipe column every Saturday on eve woman magazine, it is published on standard newspaper  

Mandhry is a judge on the first Kenya's reality cooking competition, Kikwetu Supa Chef, which airs on K24. Mandhry owns the L’artiste Pastry Factory and is a representative of the Kenya's Chef Association. Mandhry was appointed the brand ambassador for Kericho Gold Tea. He has been named among the top 5 reigning chefs of African cuisine by Africa Style Daily. He has also been considered among top male chefs in Africa by DSTV.

Publications and media
Mandhry has appeared in newspapers, magazines, radio and television. In December 2011 Mandhry appeared alongside Osama el Sayed on Ma Osama Atyab to promote authentic Kenyan cuisine.

Honors and awards
International Hall of Fame Award, The Sweet Life
Sheikh Khalifa bin Zayed al Nahyan Sports Award, Tamu Tamu, NTV Arabic edition

References

20th-century births
Living people
People from Mombasa
Kenyan Ismailis
Year of birth missing (living people)
Kenyan people of Gujarati descent